Balkeerie is a village in Angus, Scotland north of Dundee. Eassie is noted for the presence of the Eassie Stone, a carved Pictish stone.

See also
Wester Denoon

References

Villages in Angus, Scotland